Javier Villalobos is an American politician who is the current Mayor of McAllen, Texas.  He won election in June 2021 and was sworn in on June 14, 2021.

Education
Villalobos received a Bachelor of Business Administration in accounting from Southwest Texas State University, now Texas State University, and a Juris Doctor degree from the Thurgood Marshall School of Law.

Career
Villalobos spent 26 years as an attorney in the areas of Criminal, Family, and Government/Administrative law. He served as chairman of the Hidalgo County GOP, provided legal advice to local governments and mounted an unsuccessful campaign for McAllen City Commission in 2015. He served as a City Commissioner for District 1 from 2018-2021 prior to being elected Mayor of McAllen. He ran for the Texas House of Representatives for House District 41 in 2008. In 2018, he was appointed by Governor of Texas Greg Abbott to the Prepaid Higher Education Tuition Board for a term set to expire February 1, 2023.

References

 

Living people
Mayors of places in Texas
Texas Republicans
Texas State University alumni
Thurgood Marshall School of Law alumni
Year of birth missing (living people)